Muirkirk Football Club are a Scottish football club, based in the village of Muirkirk, East Ayrshire. Nicknamed the Kirk, they were formed in 1937, and they play at Burnside Park.

The team has been managed by Kevin Muirhead, formerly of Newmains United and Hamilton Accies, since October 2017 replacing George Grierson.

Over the club's 80-year history, many players have made the move to senior clubs. John McGuigan started as a youngster at Muirkirk before going on to play with Newcastle United, Southampton and Swansea City, Bernie Kelly went on to play with Leicester City and Middlesbrough, and Eric Caldow notched up 265 appearances for Rangers.

Current squad

As of July 2021

Coaching staff

Honours

Ayrshire Second Division winners: 1984–85
West Region League Two Runners Up: 2019–20

References

External links

Football clubs in Scotland
Association football clubs established in 1937
Scottish Junior Football Association clubs
Football in East Ayrshire
1937 establishments in Scotland
West of Scotland Football League teams